Eureka is the third studio album by the American alternative rock band Rooney. It was released on June 8, 2010.

The album is the band's first to be released on their own label California Dreamin' Records.  The album was released on CD and vinyl, with a deluxe digital edition featuring four bonus tracks. The band took pre-orders for the album where fans could choose from an autographed CD or vinyl in addition to an exclusive t-shirt. The entire album was streamed a week before its release date on the group's MySpace page. Bassist Matthew Winter departed from the band after the recording of the album. While he is featured on the recording of the album, he is not on the album cover.

On May 14, 2010 the band debuted the video for first single "I Can't Get Enough." A second single "Holdin' On" was released early in 2011. The album debuted on the Billboard 200 chart at number 153. It received mixed reviews.

Track listing
All songs written by Robert Coppola Schwartzman, except "Into the Blue" by Louie Stephens; "The Hunch" by Ned Brower and Taylor Locke.
 "Holdin' On" - 4:07
 "I Can't Get Enough" - 3:06
 "Only Friend" - 3:51
 "Into the Blue" - 3:33
 "All or Nothing" - 3:55
 "The Hunch" - 2:30
 "I Don't Wanna Lose You" - 3:10
 "Stars and Stripes" - 4:00
 "Go On" - 3:20
 "You're What I'm Looking For" - 3:37
 "Not in My House" - 3:29
 "Don't Look at Me" - 3:59
Deluxe bonus tracks
 "Pity" - 3:26
 "I Don't Wanna Lose You" (Acoustic) - 3:14
 "Can't Put Your Heart Around Everyone" - 3:14
 "Go On" (Acoustic Version) - 3:40

Personnel
Rooney
Robert Schwartzman - lead vocals, rhythm guitar
Taylor Locke - lead guitar, backing vocals
Matthew Winter - bass guitar
Ned Brower - drums, backing vocals
Louie Stephens - keyboards, piano, backing vocals
with:
Todd Grossman - horns on "The Hunch"

References

2010 albums
Rooney (band) albums